Petronilla van Outryve (1748, Damme – 1814, Bruges), was a Flemish noblewoman, businesswoman and political activist, known for her participation in the Brabant Revolution.  She renounced her titles and became known as Madame Stappens. She was the founder of the Jacobin Club in Bruges, hosted the political meetings during the revolution and encouraged and influenced its policies. A street was named after her.

References

1748 births
1814 deaths
Independence activists of the Brabant Revolution
Nobility of the Austrian Netherlands
People from Damme
Women of the Austrian Netherlands
Businesspeople of the Austrian Netherlands
18th-century businesswomen